= Houston Lovers' Lane Murders =

1990 unsolved murder of Cheryl Henry and Andy Atkinson

The Houston Lovers' Lane Murders refers to the 1990 murder of Cheryl Henry and Andy Atkinson in Houston, Texas. One of Houston's most notorious cold murder cases to date.

== The Crime ==
Cheryl Henry and Andy Atkinson were found murdered on August 23rd, 1990 in a secluded area known locally as The Lovers Lane.

Law enforcement officers found the bodies during their search after a security guard discovered Andy's abandoned car at the scene. The police found Cheryl was raped and murdered while Andy appeared tied to a tree with cuts across his throat so deep that he was nearly decapitated.

== Arrest ==
The Houston Police Department announced on Thursday, March 26 2026, that Floyd William Parrott, 64, has been charged with capital murder in connection with the killings of Cheryl Henry and Garland Andrew Atkinson, aged 22 and 21 respectively. The charges were filed in the 176th Criminal District Court. On Tuesday, April 28 2026, the Lancaster County Sheriff’s Office confirmed that Floyd William Parrott died by suicide in police custody while awaiting extradition to Texas.
